, better known by the stage name of , is a Japanese actor, voice actor and narrator affiliated with Ken Production. He is originally from Ōita Prefecture.

Filmography

Television animation
1988
Mister Ajikko (1988)
1989
Anpanman (1989) (Uncle Yagi, Uncle Shirokabu)
1993
Mobile Suit Victory Gundam (Mutterma Sugan, Zubroch Simonev, Fubirai Goya)
1995
El-Hazard: The Wanderers (Sir Londs)
1997
The King of Braves GaoGaiGar (Yan Long-Li)
1998
Cowboy Bebop (Jobim)
1999
Arc the Lad (Gorgon)
Zoids: Chaotic Century  (Ford)
2000
Gate Keepers (Tetsuo Ikusawa)
2001
Baki the Grappler (Gouki Shibukawa)
Hikaru no Go (Heihachi Shindō)
A Little Snow Fairy Sugar (Greta's Father)
One Piece (Monkey D. Garp)
2002
Kirby: Right Back at Ya! (Dakonyo, Doctor Moro)
Mirmo! (King Marumo)
Witch Hunter Robin (Grand Inquisitor Cortion)
Inuyasha (Wolf elder)
2003
Full Metal Panic? Fumoffu (Fujisaki-sensei)
F-Zero: GP Legend (Bellonngian "Draq" Draquillie)
2004
Naruto (Enma) 
2005
Comic Party Revolution (Chief)
2006
Honey and Clover II (Tatsuo Negishi)
Kiba (Genim)
2007
Clannad (Naoyuki Okazaki)
2008
Clannad After Story (Naoyuki Okazaki)
Persona -trinity soul- (Kubo)
Stitch! (Mr. Maeda (ep. 19))
2011
Deadman Wonderland (Rinichirō Hagire)
2012
Good Luck Girl! (Kikunoshin Suwano)
JoJo's Bizarre Adventure (Wang Chung)
Naruto: Shippuden (Enma, Gamabunta Ep. 249+)
Toriko (Melk The First)
2014
Buddy Complex (Sadamichi Jyunyou, Richardson)
Haikyū!! (Ukai Sr.)
Nobunaga Concerto (Asakura Kagetake)
Garo: The Animation (Father Nicholas)
2015
Yamada-kun and the Seven Witches (Inuzuka)
World Trigger (Councilor Viza)
Plastic Memories (Antonio Horizon)
2016
Aikatsu Stars! (Eikichi Uchida (ep. 33))
Anne Happy (Head teacher (ep. 1))
2017
Boruto: Naruto Next Generations (Tanuki Shigaraki)
Altair: A Record of Battles (Wan Yixin)
Sagrada Reset (Hiroyuki Sasano)
2019
Ascendance of a Bookworm (Gustaf)
2020
BNA: Brand New Animal (Yūji Tachiki)
2022
Tribe Nine (Tenshin Ōtori)

Original video animation OVA
Here is Greenwood (1991) (Mitsuru's Grandfather)
Mega Man: Upon a Star (1993) (Dr. Light)
Final Fantasy: Legend of the Crystals (1994) (Gush) 
El-Hazard: The Magnificent World (1995) (Roll Londs)
Magical Girl Pretty Sammy (1995) (Sam)
The King of Braves GaoGaiGar Final (2000) (Yan Long-Li)
Hellsing Ultimate (2006) (Doc)
Mobile Suit Gundam: The Origin (2015–16) (Johann Ibrahim Revil)

Anime films
Doraemon: Nobita's Three Visionary Swordsmen (1994) (A soldier)
Cowboy Bebop: The Movie (2001) (Jobim) 
Origin: Spirits of the Past (2006) (Oyakata)
Naruto the Movie: Blood Prison (2011) (Gamabunta)
A Letter to Momo (2012) (Yota's father)
The Deer King (2021)
Mobile Suit Gundam: Cucuruz Doan's Island (2022) (Johann Ibrahim Revil)

Video games
Jak II (2003) (Kor)
Tales of the Abyss (2005) (Spinoza)
JoJo's Bizarre Adventure: All-Star Battle (2013) (Wang Chung)
Breath of Fire 6 (2016) (Jubei)
The Legend of Zelda: Breath of the Wild  (2017) (King Rhoam)
Fire Emblem Echoes: Shadows of Valentia (2017) (Mycen)
Samurai Shodown (2019) (Jubei Yagyu/Kuroko/System Voice/Announcer)
Lost Judgment (2022) (Shusuke Kenmochi)

Tokusatsu
Kamen Rider Drive  (2014) (Bat-Type Roidmude 033/Scooper Roidmude (ep. 7 - 8))
Doubutsu Sentai Zyuohger (2016) (Hantajii (ep. 14 - 15))
Kamen Rider Heisei Generations: Dr. Pac-Man vs. Ex-Aid & Ghost with Legend Riders  (2016) (HatenaBugster)

Dubbing

Live-action
Robert Picardo
Star Trek: Deep Space Nine (Dr. Lewis Zimmerman)
Star Trek: Voyager (The Doctor)
Star Trek: First Contact (Emergency Medical Hologram 	)
Supernatural (Wayne Whittaker)
Chuck (Dr. Howard Busgang)
Robert Brown
Octopussy (2006 DVD edition) (M)
A View to a Kill (2006 DVD edition) (M)
The Living Daylights (2006 DVD edition) (M)
Licence to Kill (2006 DVD edition) (M)
Anger Management (Chuck (John Turturro))
Apollo 13 (Seymour Liebergot (Clint Howard))
Beverly Hills Cop (Netflix edition) (Lieutenant Andrew Bogomil (Ronny Cox))
Beverly Hills Cop II (Netflix edition) (Lieutenant Andrew Bogomil (Ronny Cox))
The Box (Dick Burns (Holmes Osborne))
Caravan of Courage: An Ewok Adventure (Deej)
Cinderella (King Rowan (Pierce Brosnan))
Disobedience (Rav Krushka (Anton Lesser))
Donnie Brasco (Bruno)
Drop Zone (1998 TV Asahi edition) (Bobby (Rex Linn))
Everest (John Taske (Tim Dantay))
The Fourth Kind (Abel Campos (Elias Koteas))
Grey's Anatomy (Dr. Richard Webber (James Pickens Jr.))
The Gunman (Cox (Mark Rylance))
Hancock (Executive (Michael Mann))
Hansel & Gretel: Witch Hunters (Sheriff Berringer (Peter Stormare))
Hercules (Cotys (John Hurt))
In Dreams (Doctor Silverman (Stephen Rea))
Indiana Jones and the Kingdom of the Crystal Skull (Harold 'Ox' Oxley (John Hurt))
Kingdom of Heaven (Raynald of Châtillon (Brendan Gleeson))
King's War (Fan Zeng (Sun Haiying))
The Last Boy Scout (Big Ray Walston (Tony Longo))
Léon: The Professional (1996 TV Asahi edition) (Mathilda's Father (Michael Badalucco))
Licence to Kill (1996 TBS edition) (Montelongo (Claudio Brook))
Man of Steel (Dr. Emil Hamilton (Richard Schiff))
Meteor Storm (Brock (Kevin McNulty))
Million Dollar Arm (Ray Poitevint (Alan Arkin))
Mission: Impossible (2003 TV Asahi edition) (Frank Barnes (Dale Dye))
Mission: Impossible 2 (Senor De L'Arena)
The Ninth Gate (Bernie Ornstein (James Russo))
Notting Hill (Martin (James Dreyfus))
October Sky (Leon Bolden (Randy Stripling))
The Pale Horse (Inspector Stanley Lejeune (Sean Pertwee))
The People v. O. J. Simpson: American Crime Story (Johnnie Cochran (Courtney B. Vance))
Platoon (1998 DVD edition) (King (Keith David))
Platoon (2003 TV Tokyo edition) (Big Harold (Forest Whitaker))
Pokémon Detective Pikachu (Howard Clifford (Bill Nighy))
The Poseidon Adventure (2016 BS-TBS edition) (Manny Rosen (Jack Albertson))
Resident Evil: Extinction (2010 TV Asahi edition) (Albert Wesker (Jason O'Mara))
Shaft (John Shaft, Sr. (Richard Roundtree))
Snatch (Darren (Jason Flemyng))
Three Kings (Conrad Vig (Spike Jonze))
Tomb Raider (Mr. Yaffe (Derek Jacobi))
Tomorrow Never Dies (Dr. Dave Greenwalt (Colin Stinton), General Bukharin (Terence Rigby))
Valkyrie (Friedrich Olbricht (Bill Nighy))
The Virgin Suicides (Father Moody (Scott Glenn))
Who Framed Roger Rabbit (Wheezy, Big Bat Wolf)
The Wraith (1992 TV Asahi edition) (Rughead (Clint Howard))
The Young and Prodigious T.S. Spivet (Two Clouds (Dominique Pinon))

Animation
Batman: The Brave and the Bold (Professor Milo)

References

External links
Official agency profile 
Hiroshi Naka at Ryu's Seiyuu Infos

1960 births
Living people
Japanese male stage actors
Japanese male video game actors
Japanese male voice actors
Ken Production voice actors
Male voice actors from Ōita Prefecture
20th-century Japanese male actors
21st-century Japanese male actors